The Resistance Pro Wrestling Heavyweight Championship is a professional wrestling heavyweight championship and the highest ranked title in the promotion.

Combined reigns 

References

Heavyweight wrestling championships